The tenth season of the American comedy series Will & Grace premiered on October 4, 2018. The season concluded on April 4, 2019, and consisted of 18 episodes.

Production
In August 2017, Will & Grace was renewed for a second 13-episode season. In March 2018, NBC ordered five more episodes bringing the total to 18, and it was also renewed for an 18-episode third season. The revival is shot on Stage 22 at Universal Studios Hollywood, as opposed to Stage 17 at CBS Studio Center. Filming ran from July 18 to December 19, 2018.

Cast and characters

Main cast
 Eric McCormack as Will Truman
 Debra Messing as Grace Adler
 Megan Mullally as Karen Walker
 Sean Hayes as Jack McFarland

Recurring
 David Schwimmer as Noah Broader
 Brian Jordan Alvarez as Estefan Gloria 
 David Douglas as Edward
 Matt Bomer as McCoy Whitman
 Livia Treviño as Mrs. Timmer
 Robert Klein as Martin Adler
 Blythe Danner as Marilyn Truman-Adler
Samira Wiley as Nikki

Special guest stars
 Alec Baldwin as Malcolm Widmark
 Leslie Jordan as Beverley Leslie
 Jon Cryer as himself
 Minnie Driver as Lorraine Finster
 Chelsea Handler as Donna Zimmer
 Andrea Martin as Zusanna
 Molly Shannon as Val Bassett
 Tim Bagley as Larry

Guest cast
 Charles C. Stevenson Jr. as Smitty
 Samuel Faraci as Skip
 Yelyna De Leon as Blanca
 Clinton Leupp as Miss Coco Peru
 Martha Kelly as Patty
 Derek Gaines as Theodore
 Mary McCormack as Janet Adler
 Tucker Smallwood as Professor Henry Rice
 Aya Cash as Olivia Walker
 Barrett Foa as Paul
 Reid Scott as Marcus

Episodes

Reception

Ratings

References

2018 American television seasons
2019 American television seasons
10
Television episodes directed by James Burrows